Arenosa Creek is a stream in Victoria County and Jackson County, Texas, in the United States.

Arenosa is the Spanish word for "sandy".

See also
List of rivers of Texas

References

Rivers of Jackson County, Texas
Rivers of Victoria County, Texas
Rivers of Texas